Worle is a large village in North Somerset which is joined to the seaside town of Weston-super-Mare on its western edge. It, however, maintains a very separate identity, and may now be bigger than its more famous neighbour. Worle pre-dates Weston and was mentioned in the Domesday Book of 1086. "Walter of Douai holds of the King, Worle. Edgar held it in the time of King Edward, and gelded for six hides and a half." The parish church of St Martin's sits on the side of Worlebury Hill and overlooks the village.

History

The name was possibly formed from the Old English Wor + leah meaning 'wood or clearing frequented by grouse', or perhaps 'moor meadow'. The parish was part of the Winterstoke Hundred.

Worle has grown dramatically in the last 40 years. That initial development in the 1970s and 1980s included a large number of houses, a Sainsburys supermarket, a secondary school and an ecumenical church (St Marks). However, in recent years a larger range of facilities and amenities have opened up, including large stores, shops, a medical centre, a railway station and additional churches. Weston-super-Mare's Magistrates Court has relocated to Worle. It also has a number of active groups and societies including a Lions club.

St Martin's Church was built in 1125 and rebuilt during the 14th and 15th centuries, with major restoration and extension work in 1870. The Church is now ecumenical, with Methodist as well as Church of England ministers. It is a Grade II* listed building.

The ancient parish of Worle became a civil parish in 1866. The civil parish was abolished in 1933, when most of the parish was absorbed into Weston-super-Mare. Smaller areas of the parish joined Kewstoke and Locking.

The Weston & Somerset Mercury is the local newspaper.

Previous residents included Bristol-born children's author-illustrator and actor Peter James Trapani.

Transport
Worle is located close to junction 21 of the M5 motorway.

There have been four different stations serving Worle since the Bristol and Exeter Railway opened on 14 June 1841. For most of this time, the station generally known as Puxton and Worle railway station has served, despite being situated in St Georges. From 1 March 1884 until 2 January 1922 a more convenient Worle station was provided on the Loop Line. Puxton and Worle closed on 6 April 1964.

There was also a Worle Town station situated much closer to the High Street but only served by the Weston, Clevedon and Portishead Railway from 1897 to 1940.

The present day Worle railway station is situated midway between the two former sites and was opened on 24 September 1990. Since 2008 longer express trains have been allowed to stop at Worle's short platform with the express train opening the doors of up to 4 coaches. This has enabled passengers from Worle to travel to London and all the stops in-between. Before most people had to change at either Weston-super-Mare railway station or Bristol Temple Meads railway station.

Worle has bus connections running every ten minutes into the centre of Weston-super-Mare and bus routes to Bristol and other locations, which is adjacent to the local McDonalds and Sainsburys supermarket, the buses that serve this are: X1, X5, A3, 3 & 7.

Education
Worle includes two secondary schools, Worle Community School and Priory Community School, and several primary schools, including Becket Primary School, Mendip Green First School, Worle Village Primary, St Martin's Primary, Mead Vale Primary School, Herons' Moor Academy, Castle Batch Primary School and St Mark's Primary School.

Mendip Green Primary School is one of the largest primary schools in the area, with 407 children of 4 – 8 years of age (2008). Mendip Green was one of the first schools in North Somerset achieving Healthy School Status, also it has Leading aspect Award, and a hearing and language resource base.

References

External links

 Website of Worle Bellringers, St Martin's Church

Villages in North Somerset
Weston-super-Mare
Former civil parishes in Somerset